Miles Hugh Barrett Jupp (born 8 September 1979) is an English actor, singer, and comedian. He began his career as a stand-up comedian before playing the role of the inventor Archie in the children's television series Balamory. He also played John Duggan in The Thick of It, Nigel in the sitcom Rev, and appeared on many comedy panel shows. In September 2015, Jupp replaced Sandi Toksvig as the host of The News Quiz on BBC Radio 4.

Early life
Jupp was born in 1979 in Newcastle upon Tyne and spent most of his childhood in London. He is the son of a minister in the United Reformed Church. For much of his life, Jupp believed he was of Belgian stock, descended from 16th-century Huguenot immigrants. However, while creating a programme for BBC Radio 4 in 2015, he discovered his roots are actually in Sussex.

He attended three independent schools: The Hall School in Hampstead, North London; St George's School in Windsor; and Oakham School in Rutland. He studied Divinity at the University of Edinburgh. While there, he performed with an improvised comedy troupe, the Improverts, and took part in pantomime productions with the Edinburgh University Theatre Company at Bedlam Theatre.

Career
Jupp won So You Think You're Funny?, Leicester Mercury Comedian of the Year in 2001 and was a Perrier Award Best Newcomer nominee in 2003 for his show Gentlemen Prefer Brogues. During his appearance on Celebrity Mastermind andTest Match Special in 2011, he claimed to have bluffed his way onto an England cricket tour to India as the cricket correspondent for both BBC Scotland and the Western Mail. He wrote Fibber in the Heat, a book about his adventures as a cricket journalist in India.

Television and film
Jupp played Archie, the Inventor in CBeebies' Balamory. He also had a role in the BBC Scotland comedy programme, Live Floor Show, where he played an eccentric, foul-mouthed comedian. In 2007, Jupp appeared fleetingly in Harry Potter and the Order of the Phoenix as a television weatherman who complained about a hot drought.

Jupp appeared in Series 3 and 4 of the political comedy, The Thick of It, as John Duggan, an incompetent press officer with a habit of making inappropriate comments. He appeared in BBC Scotland's comedy Gary: Tank Commander as Captain Fanshaw. In 2009, he appeared briefly in the film Sherlock Holmes as a waiter. In the same year, he also appeared in Stewart Lee's Comedy Vehicle.

In 2010, Jupp appeared on Mock the Week, Michael McIntyre's Comedy Roadshow. He performed as Nigel, a Church of England Lay Reader, in the BBC sitcom Rev. He also appeared as an under-secretary in the film Made in Dagenham (2010).

In January 2011, Jupp was a team member alongside Goldie and Phill Jupitus on the music quiz Never Mind The Buzzcocks. In May 2011, November 2011, and April 2012, he was a panelist on Have I Got News for You and Would I Lie To You? (BBC). On 22 August 2011, he was a lunchtime guest on Test Match Special, where he revealed a love of cricket and that he had previously worked with the Test Match Special team, who had no idea who he was. This became the basis of the book Fibber in the Heat.

In October 2011, he again appeared in Mock the Week. Jupp had a cameo role in Johnny English Reborn in 2011 as an employee of MI7. He appeared in Series 4, Episode 4 of the comedy panel game Argumental, which aired on 24 November 2011. In 2012, he appeared on Mock the Week.

In January 2012, he won on Celebrity Mastermind. In February 2012, he appeared on BBC Let's Dance for Sport Relief and danced to The Prodigy's "Firestarter". In March 2012, he appeared in an episode of the televised 45th Anniversary series of BBC Radio 4's Just a Minute quiz show, alongside Paul Merton, Gyles Brandreth and Liza Tarbuck. In July 2013, he appeared in an episode of I'm Sorry I Haven't a Clue on BBC Radio 4. He was featured in the 2014 World War II film, The Monuments Men, as British officer Major Fielding. Jupp has also appeared eight times on 8 Out of 10 Cats Does Countdown between 2014 and 2021. 

In 2014, Jupp narrated the BBC television documentary series, Building Dream Homes. In 2016, he appeared in Grimsby as a police officer. On 27 April 2016, it was announced that Jupp would voice Blackberry in the forthcoming adaptation of Watership Down. In 2015, Jupp appeared as a team captain on The Really Welsh Christmas Quiz, alongside comedians Chris Corcoran, Elis James, and Omar Hamdi.

In October 2016, Jupp appeared as Giles, the chairman of the residents' committee, in the sitcom from BBC Three Josh. In 2017, he appeared as Hardy in the film, Journey's End. He played auction house appraiser Winford Collins in the episode "The Tanganyika Green" of Father Brown. In 2018, Jupp made guest appearances as Basil, an incompetent lawyer, in the television drama by ITV The Durrells.

Radio
Jupp was the narrator of the radio show The Penny Dreadfuls Present...The Brothers Faversham by the Penny Dreadfuls, which was broadcast at the beginning of 2008 on BBC Radio 7.

In 2009, Jupp became the host of BBC Radio 7 satirical comedy series Newsjack and the host of BBC Radio Scotland comedy quiz show Swots. In February 2011, he appeared as a panelist on BBC Radio 4's panel show It's Your Round. Starting in February 2012, Jupp hosted three series of a BBC Radio 4 panel show It's Not What You Know (based on his suggestion for a round on It's Your Round.), before handing the job over to Joe Lycett.

In 2011, he starred in the self-penned BBC Radio 4 comedy, In and Out of the Kitchen, "the diary, written for publication, of a somewhat minor celebrity chef, Damien Trench". A second series followed in 2013, and continued with a third series in 2014. The show had a short-lived television version in 2015. A six-part fourth series aired on BBC Radio 4 in August and September 2015.

Jupp appeared as a contestant on BBC Radio 4's The News Quiz in April 2012 (Series 77; Episode 1). In June 2015 he became the new presenter of the show, replacing Sandi Toksvig. He chaired the show for 12 series, with his last appearance on 31 May 2019 (Series 99; Episode 8).

Jupp appears as retired Prime Minister Henry Tobin in Party's Over from 2019 to 2022 (12 episodes). In 2022, his four-episode sketch show, Whatever Next? With Miles Jupp was broadcast on Radio 4.

Live
In March 2008, Jupp performed his third solo show, Everyday Rage and Dinner Party Chit Chat, at the Etcetera Theatre in Camden. He presented Live at the Gilded Balloon podcast for The Guardian newspaper's coverage of the 2008 and 2009 Edinburgh Fringe. In 2019, Jupp played the role of actor David Tomlinson in The Life I Live, a one-man show at the Salisbury Playhouse and other theatres.

Personal life
Jupp and his wife Rachel met while studying in Edinburgh. They have five children. The family moved from Peckham, South London, to Monmouthshire, Wales.

Filmography

Film

Television

Theatre

Stand-up shows
Gentlemen Prefer Brogues (2003–04) Edinburgh Festival
Young Man in a Huff (2005) Edinburgh Festival
Everyday Rage & Dinner Party Chit Chat (2007) Edinburgh Festival
Drifting (2008) Edinburgh Festival
Telling It Like It Might Be (2009) Edinburgh Festival
Fibber in the Heat (2010) Edinburgh Festival & National Tour
Miles Jupp Is the Chap You're Thinking Of (2014) United Kingdom Tour
Songs of Freedom (2016) stand up tour

References

External links

Miles Jupp at The Guardian
Miles Jupp entry at Who's Who

1979 births
Living people
20th-century English comedians
20th-century English male actors
21st-century English comedians
21st-century English male actors
Alumni of the University of Edinburgh
English male comedians
English male film actors
English male television actors
English radio presenters
English stand-up comedians
People educated at Oakham School
People educated at St George's School, Windsor Castle
People educated at The Hall School, Hampstead